Baenothrips is a genus of thrips in the family Phlaeothripidae.

Species
 Baenothrips asper
 Baenothrips caenosus
 Baenothrips chiliensis
 Baenothrips cuneatus
 Baenothrips erythrinus
 Baenothrips guatemalensis
 Baenothrips indicus
 Baenothrips minutus
 Baenothrips moundi
 Baenothrips murphyi
 Baenothrips quadratus
 Baenothrips ryukyuensis

References

Phlaeothripidae
Thrips
Thrips genera